Daniel Andres Ferreyra (born 22 January 1982) is an Argentine football goalkeeper. He currently plays for Cusco FC in the Peruvian Primera División.

Career
Ferreyra began his career with Argentine giants River Plate, but shortly after making his first team debut he was transferred to Rosario Central in 2003. By 2004 he had been released from his contract and found himself playing for Club Athlético Candalaria in the regionalised 3rd division of Argentine football.

In 2006 Ferreyra, left Argentine football to join Coquimbo Unido in the top flight of Chilean football.

External links
 BDFA profile 

1982 births
Living people
Argentine footballers
Argentine expatriate footballers
Association football goalkeepers
Expatriate footballers in Chile
Expatriate footballers in Peru
Footballers from Buenos Aires
Club Atlético River Plate footballers
Rosario Central footballers
Coquimbo Unido footballers
José Gálvez FBC footballers
Club Deportivo Universidad César Vallejo footballers
Universidad Técnica de Cajamarca footballers
FBC Melgar footballers
Sport Boys footballers
Real Garcilaso footballers
Cienciano footballers
Peruvian Primera División players
Peruvian Segunda División players